Wymysły may refer to the following places:
Wymysły, Maków County in Masovian Voivodeship (east-central Poland)
Wymysły, Nowy Dwór Mazowiecki County in Masovian Voivodeship (east-central Poland)
Wymysły, Sokołów County in Masovian Voivodeship (east-central Poland)
Wymysły, Warmian-Masurian Voivodeship (north Poland)